Bang Chak station is a BTS Skytrain station, on the Sukhumvit line in Phra Khanong District, Bangkok, Thailand.

Opened in 2011, it is a part of the Skytrain extension from On Nut to Bearing station.

See also
 Bangkok Skytrain

References 

BTS Skytrain stations